Zwackhiomyces is a genus of lichenicolous fungi in the family Xanthopyreniaceae. The genus was circumscribed by Martin Grube and Josef Hafellner in 1990, with Zwackhiomyces coepulonus assigned as the type species.

The genus name of Zwackhiomyces is in honour of Philipp Franz Wilhelm von Zwackh-Holzhausen (1826–1903), who was a German botanist (Lichenology and Mycology). He was also a Military Officer as well as being a landowner near Heidelberg. He was financially independent and owned large Herbarium.

Species
As accepted by Species Fungorum;
Zwackhiomyces aspiciliae  – Turkey
Zwackhiomyces berengerianus 
Zwackhiomyces calcariae 
Zwackhiomyces calcisedus 
Zwackhiomyces cervinae 
Zwackhiomyces coepulonus 
Zwackhiomyces diederichii 
Zwackhiomyces dispersus 
Zwackhiomyces echinulatus 
Zwackhiomyces heppiae 
Zwackhiomyces immersae 
Zwackhiomyces lacustris 
Zwackhiomyces lecanorae 
Zwackhiomyces lecideae 
Zwackhiomyces lithoiceae 
Zwackhiomyces melanohaleae 
Zwackhiomyces namibiensis 
Zwackhiomyces parmotrematis  – Suriname
Zwackhiomyces peltigerae 
Zwackhiomyces polischukii 
Zwackhiomyces rolfii 
Zwackhiomyces sipmanii 
Zwackhiomyces socialis 
Zwackhiomyces solenopsorae 
Zwackhiomyces sphinctrinoides 
Zwackhiomyces sulcatus 
Zwackhiomyces turcicus

References

Xanthopyreniaceae
Taxa named by Josef Hafellner
Lichenicolous fungi
Taxa described in 1990